Gunvor (Gunnvǫr) is a feminine Old Norse given name. It is the feminine of Gunvar (Gunnvarr), a name composed from the elements gunn "fight" and  varr "attentive; defender, protector"

Gunvor may also refer to:
 Gunvor (company), an oil trading company
 Gunvor Galtung Haavik (1912–1977), Norwegian foreign ministry official accused of spying for the Soviet Union
 Gunvor Guggisberg (born 1974), Swiss singer knows professionally as Gunvor
 Gunvor, a ship wrecked in 1912